Qaran ("Nation") is the national anthem of Ogadenia, a country proposed by the ONLF. It is sung in Somali. The previous national anthem of Ogadenia was Abab.

Lyrics
Qaran

Afar magac ku caanow
Casaan iyo cagaarow
Xidigtii cadatd iyo buluugow
Ummad waliba caado iyo dhaqan iyo
Carro iyo degaan iyo
Summad lagu cadeediyo
Cuud baa u gooni ah
Cirifka geeska afrikow
Caynankii Soomaalow
Gacalkii curadadow
Calan dhiig ma daayow
Kaan ku caafimadee
Cudurka iga daweeyow
Cadadkii quraankiyo
Duco lagu cashariyow
Calankii dalkaygow
Calankaygii dadkaygow
Cirka sare ka walaclee
Cirka sare ka walaclee
Cirka sare ka walaclee
Cirka sare ka walaclee

Unofficial English translation

Nation

The famous four parts
The red and the green
The white star and the blue
Every society has a culture and a tradition and
An environment and a land and 
Idiosyncrasies
A unique livelihood
The Horn of Africa
The Somali identity
The dear flag of the youth
No flag without bloodshed
The flag that healed me
Cured me of my illness
The chapters of the holy Quran
Gave it its blessing
The flag of my nation
The flag of my people
Shall forever fly above the land
Shall forever fly above the land
Shall forever fly above the land
Shall forever fly above the land

Notes

African anthems
National anthems